Two Royal Norwegian Navy patrol boats have been named Rask (quick). 
  - a   launched in 1887.
  - a 
 

Royal Norwegian Navy ship names